The Arch of Freedom of the Ukrainian people is a monument in Kyiv, the capital of Ukraine. It was opened on 7 November 1982, amidst the celebration of the 1,500th Anniversary of Kyiv, to commemorate the 60th Anniversary of the USSR and the "reunification of Ukraine with Russia in 1654". (The Pereiaslav Agreement as it was known in the Soviet Union).

The sculpture under the arch, which depicted a Ukrainian worker and a Russian worker standing together, was dismantled in April 2022 amidst the 2022 Russian invasion of Ukraine.

Name 
Official name of the monument in Soviet times: Monument to commemorate the reunification of Ukraine with Russia. After the restoration of Ukraine's independence until May 2022, the monument was renamed the Peoples' Friendship Arch, colloquial name was the Yarmo.

On 14 May 2022, according to the decision of the Kyiv City Council, it was named the Arch of Freedom of the Ukrainian people.

Description

The Friendship Arch was constructed in 1982 by sculptor A. Skoblikov and architect I. Ivanov and others. The monument consisted of three sculptural elements: an arch and two statues.

 A  in diameter, rainbow-shaped arch, made of titanium.
 A bronze statue depicting a Russian and a Ukrainian worker holding up the Soviet Order of Friendship of Peoples
 A granite stele depicting the participants of the Pereyaslav Council of 1654.

The surviving arch is located next to a viewing deck where most of Kyiv's east bank can be viewed, Troieschyna and towards the north of the city, Podil and Obolon.

The monument was unveiled by the First Secretary of the Communist Party Volodymyr Shcherbytsky amidst the celebration of the 1,500th Anniversary of Kyiv, on 7 November 1982, to commemorate the 60th Anniversary of the USSR and the reunification of Ukraine with Russia in 1654. Although the USSR was proclaimed on 30 December 1922; 7 November 1982 was the 65th anniversary of the October Revolution of 1917. The monument was opened together with the All-Union Lenin Museum (today, Ukrainian House).

The arch had the local nickname "yoke" ("Yarmo").

Location
The whole People's Friendship Arch complex (and its surviving arch) was located on top of the right bank of the Dnieper river overlooking the Park Bridge and the Shore Highway. (Park Bridge is a pedestrian bridge that connects the city with Trukhaniv island.) This location is behind the buildings complex of the National Philharmonic Society of Ukraine in "Khreschatyi" Park which at the time of opening was called the Pioneer Park.

Dismantling
On 20 May 2016, the Ukrainian government announced plans to dismantle the arch as part of its decommunization laws. In its place, a memorial dedicated to veterans of the Russo-Ukrainian War was planned. The Director of the Ukrainian Institute of National Remembrance Volodymyr Viatrovych stated in February 2018, that "a sculptural group" of the monument should be removed according to the decommunization laws.

For the Eurovision Song Contest 2017, the arch was temporarily painted as a rainbow and renamed the Arch of Diversity. It doubled as the symbol of the Kyiv Pride parade, and was illuminated as a rainbow at night.

In 2018, human rights activists put a temporary sticker on the arch that looked like a crack. This was a sign of support for political prisoners who are illegally detained in Russia and annexed Crimea. According to the organizers, the action aims to draw attention to the fate of Ukrainian citizens, as well as to urge everyone to make as much effort as possible to free political prisoners in Russia.

After the Russian invasion of Ukraine, on 25 April 2022, mayor of Kyiv, Vitali Klitschko, announced the dismantling of the sculptural part of the monument as having lost its ideological meaning. The next day, during the dismantling of a bronze sculptural group, the head of a figure symbolizing a Russian fell off. The second sculptural composition made of red granite will be taken apart later. The arch itself is planned to be renamed and highlighted with the color of the Ukrainian flag. Klitschko proposed to the Kyiv City Council to rename the arch of the People's Friendship Arch into the Arch of Freedom of the Ukrainian People. One of the designers of the monument, Serhiy Myrhorodsky, agreed with the dismantling of the monument.

The People's Friendship Arch was one of 60 monuments that the Kyiv City Council planned (in April 2022) to remove. On 14 May 2022, according to the decision of the Kyiv City Council, it was named the Arch of Freedom of the Ukrainian people.

Gallery

See also
 Derussification in Ukraine
 Decommunization in Ukraine
 Afghanistan War Memorial, Kyiv
 Valerii Lobanovskyi Dynamo Stadium

References

External links

 Kiev City Guide — Statues and monuments of Kyiv City
 www.go2kiev.com — places to see in Kyiv

1500th anniversary of Kyiv
1982 sculptures
Cultural infrastructure completed in 1982
Cultural history of Ukraine
Buildings and structures in Kyiv
Tourist attractions in Kyiv
Arches and vaults
Culture in Kyiv
Monuments and memorials in Kyiv
1982 establishments in Ukraine
Colossal statues in Ukraine